The Last Kinection is an Indigenous hip-hop group from Newcastle, New South Wales, Australia. The band was formed in 2006 by Joel Wenitong, DJ Jay Tee (both from Local Knowledge) and Naomi Wenitong (Shakaya). The Last Kinection first came to attention with its reworking of the Peter Allen song, "I Still Call Australia Home".

History

Elefant Tracks
In June 2010, The Last Kinection was officially signed to Independent, Sydney record label Elefant Traks who released the band's second album, Next of Kin, in 2011.

Touring
In 2009, the band supported Public Enemy. They followed this up with a national tour beginning in July.

Accident
In September 2008, the band was involved in a car accident, with Naomi Wenitong and DJ Jay Tee receiving serious injuries. And their other member had died in the accident. Wenitong sustained a broken femur, jaw, wrist, ribs, fractured pelvis, head injuries and was left in a coma. The accident was featured in an episode of the Crash Investigation Unit TV series.

Awards
The band has won Deadly Awards in 2009 and 2010 for outstanding achievement in R 'n' B and hip hop and in 2011 for Best Band and Best Single. In 2012, The Last Kinection received the Deadly award for "Best Band of the Year".

Discography 
 Nutches (2008) – BlackChili Productions
Next of Kin (2011) – Elefant Traks

References 

Indigenous Australian musical groups
New South Wales musical groups
Australian hip hop groups